Mongmit Township (Shan: မိူင်းမိတ်ႈ) is a township of Mongmit District (formerly part of Kyaukme District) in the Shan State of eastern Burma. The principal town is Mongmit.

References

Townships of Shan State